Mossy Creek is an unincorporated community in Augusta County, Virginia, United States. The Hannah Miller House and the Henry Miller House, which are listed on the National Register of Historic Places, are both located near Mossy Creek.

References

Unincorporated communities in Augusta County, Virginia
Unincorporated communities in Virginia